The following is a list of 1993 Seattle Mariners draft picks. The Mariners took part in the June regular draft, also known as the Rule 4 draft. The Mariners made 69 selections in the 1993 draft, the first being shortstop Alex Roidriguez, now in the 3,000 hit club, in the first round. In all, the Mariners selected 37 pitchers, 13 outfielders, 7 catchers, 6 shortstops, 2 first basemen, 2 second basemen, and 2 third basemen.

Draft

Key

Table

References
General references

Inline citations

External links
Seattle Mariners official website